Valerio Dorico (Brescia, fifteenth century - Rome, late fifteenth century) was an Italian typographer. Over a period of sixteen years (1539–1555) he printed numerous editions, pioneering the use of a single impression printing process first developed in England and France. He worked primarily for the Roman Academy with his brother Ludovico Dorico. Dorico printed first editions of sacred music by Giovanni Pierluigi da Palestrina and Giovanni Animuccia.

The scorewriter Dorico is named in his honor.

References

External links
 Valerio Dorico editions at IMSLP

Italian typographers and type designers
Renaissance music printers
15th-century Italian businesspeople
Year of birth missing
Year of death missing
15th-century artists